Oleh Leonidovych Meidych (born 24 November 1970) is a Ukrainian businessman and politician currently serving as a People's Deputy of Ukraine from Ukraine's 18th electoral district, representing north-eastern Vinnytsia Oblast.

Biography 
Meidych is director of Kalinov Dairy Plant Ltd.

In 2002 and 2010, he ran for the Vinnytsia Oblast Council, both times unsuccessfully. Meidich worked as an assistant to People's Deputy Petro Gasyuk.

From 2015, Meidych was a member of the Vinnytsia Oblast Council, serving as head of the Batkivshchyna party in the council, as well as a member of the Standing Committee on Regulation of Communal Property and Privatization.

He was a proxy candidate of Yulia Tymoshenko in the 2019 Ukrainian presidential election.

In the 2019 Ukrainian parliamentary election, Meidych was a successful candidate for People's Deputy of Ukraine, running in Ukraine's 18th electoral district as a member of Batkivshchyna. He currently serves as First Deputy Chairman of the Committee on Agrarian Policy and Land Relations in the Verkhovna Rada.

References 

1970 births
Living people
Ukrainian businesspeople
Ukrainian politicians
People from Kalynivka